Marcelo Moretto de Souza (born 10 May 1978), known as Moretto, is a Brazilian professional footballer who plays as a goalkeeper.

Club career

Early years
Born in Eldorado, Mato Grosso do Sul, Moretto played four years professionally in his home country, representing São José, Portuguesa, Londrina, Sport, Brasiliense and 15 de Novembro. In 2003, aged 25, he decided to try his luck in Portugal, joining S.C. Salgueiros in the second division and making a very good first impression during the pre-season; however, facing serious economical crisis, the club was relegated to the third level and lost all of its professional players.

Forced to look for another team, Moretto joined F.C. Felgueiras (also in division two). There, he played only eight matches and conceded a total of ten goals but, nevertheless, caught the attention of other sides in the country.

In January 2005, Moretto came close playing for G.D. Estoril Praia and F.C. Penafiel – both in the Primeira Liga – but ended up signing for two years with fellow league club Vitória F.C. to replace Fulham-bound Ricardo Batista. He soon became the coach's first option while the team performed above all expectations, winning the Portuguese Cup after beating S.L. Benfica in the final.

In 2005–06, Moretto started off the season in Setúbal. They performed well during the first half, with him appearing in 17 matches and conceding only five goals; after enjoying a remarkable success, Vitória was struck by the resignation of their coach Luís Norton de Matos and a few other players due to unpaid wages, and 2005 ended with the player being the number one goalkeeper of all European leagues, with the fewest goals conceded per minute played.

Benfica
During the 2005 Christmas and New Year break in Portugal, a lot was spoken in the press about Moretto's possible transfer to Benfica or FC Porto. In a controversial move he followed his will and picked Benfica to be his new club after explaining the allegedly "bad behaviour" of both the player's manager and Porto chairmen; Porto officially denied immediate interest in the player, and the transfer cost Benfica €1 million whilst he signed for five-and-a-half years.

Benfica's interest gained strength as José Moreira suffered an injury that would keep him off the pitch for the remainder of the season. Quim, the team's other goalkeeper also suffered an injury, leaving them with only junior Rui Nereu to play both the domestic league and the UEFA Champions League; upon his arrival, Moretto immediately became Ronald Koeman's number one choice between the posts, even with Quim fully recovered: throughout the rest of the campaign he played on 18 occasions in the league, once in the cup and four times in the Champions League, against reigning champions Liverpool (conceding no goals) and FC Barcelona, where he put on a Player of the match performance with several saves.

Moretto did not have an easy time after joining Benfica because, alternating above-average performances with subpar ones, he suffered from the animosity of the club supporters, which undermined his concentration. As a result, upon the departure of Koeman and arrival of his replacement, Fernando Santos, he was relegated to the role of substitute, with Quim again becoming the starter; during 2006–07 he played only one game, often splitting the bench with Moreira.

On 13 July 2007, Moretto agreed to join AEK Athens F.C. on a loan deal. The Greek club had the option to purchase the player at the end of the loan period, which was not activated, and he returned to Benfica for the 2008–09 season.

Late career
On 3 August 2009, Benfica released Moretto from his contract, with the player planning to return to his country. Late in the year he signed with a team he had already represented, Brasiliense in the Série B.

In July 2010, however, Moretto returned to Portugal, signing with lowly top tier side S.C. Olhanense for two years. In the following transfer window, however, he changed teams – and countries – again, joining Arka Gdynia from Poland.

Personal life
Moretto's younger brother, André (born 1987), was also a footballer and a goalkeeper. He was under contract with Vitória de Setúbal for several years as well, but never represented the first team.

Gustavo Manduca, who shared teams with him at Benfica, was Moretto's brother-in-law.

Career statistics

Club

Honours
Vitória Setúbal
Taça de Portugal: 2004–05

Benfica
Taça da Liga: 2008–09

References

External links
 
 
 

1978 births
Living people
Brazilian people of Italian descent
Brazilian footballers
Association football goalkeepers
Campeonato Brasileiro Série A players
Campeonato Brasileiro Série B players
São José Esporte Clube players
Associação Portuguesa de Desportos players
Londrina Esporte Clube players
Sport Club do Recife players
Brasiliense Futebol Clube players
Avaí FC players
América Futebol Clube (MG) players
Associação Atlética Portuguesa (RJ) players
Primeira Liga players
Liga Portugal 2 players
F.C. Felgueiras players
S.C. Salgueiros players
Vitória F.C. players
S.L. Benfica footballers
S.C. Olhanense players
Super League Greece players
AEK Athens F.C. players
Ekstraklasa players
Arka Gdynia players
Miami Dade FC players
Brazilian expatriate footballers
Expatriate footballers in Portugal
Expatriate footballers in Greece
Expatriate footballers in Poland
Expatriate soccer players in the United States
Brazilian expatriate sportspeople in Portugal
Brazilian expatriate sportspeople in Greece
Brazilian expatriate sportspeople in Poland
Brazilian expatriate sportspeople in the United States